Glasgow Kelvingrove was a burgh constituency represented in the House of Commons of the Parliament of the United Kingdom from 1918 until 1983. It elected one Member of Parliament (MP) using the first-past-the-post voting system.   In February 1974 it absorbed the entire Glasgow Woodside Constituency which had existed from 1950 but lost the part of the Exchange Ward it had previously included to Glasgow Central.

Boundaries 
1950–1955: The County of the City of Glasgow wards of Anderston and Park.

1955–1974: The County of the City of Glasgow wards of Anderston and Park, and part of Exchange ward.

1974–1983: The County of the City of Glasgow wards of Anderston, Botanic Gardens, Kelvin, Park, Partick East, and Woodside.

Members of Parliament

Elections

Elections in the 1910s

Elections in the 1920s 

* Ferguson labelled himself a Labour party candidate without any official endorsement, despite being an official Communist candidate.

Elections in the 1930s 

General Election 1939–40

Another General Election was required to take place before the end of 1940. The political parties had been making preparations for an election to take place and by the Autumn of 1939, the following candidates had been selected; 
Unionist: Walter Elliot 
Labour: 
Liberal:

Elections in the 1940s

Elections in the 1950s

Elections in the 1960s

Elections in the 1970s

References 

Historic parliamentary constituencies in Scotland (Westminster)
Constituencies of the Parliament of the United Kingdom established in 1918
Constituencies of the Parliament of the United Kingdom disestablished in 1983
Politics of Glasgow
Partick